Michael Bass may refer to:

Michael Thomas Bass (1760–1827), brewer of Burton-on-Trent, England
Michael Thomas Bass (1799–1884), British brewer and Member of Parliament
Michael Bass, 1st Baron Burton (1837–1909), British brewer, Liberal politician and philanthropist
Mike Bass (born 1945), American football player

See also
Bass baronets
Bass (surname)